More Ghost Stories is a horror short story collection by British writer M. R. James, published in 1911. Some later editions under the title Ghost Stories of an Antiquary contain it and the earlier Ghost Stories of an Antiquary in one volume. It was his second short story collection.

Contents of the original edition
 "A School Story"
 "The Rose Garden"
 "The Tractate Middoth" 
 "Casting the Runes"
 "The Stalls of Barchester Cathedral"
 "Martin's Close"
 "Mr Humphreys and His Inheritance"

References

Sources

External links 

 
  (Part 2)

1911 short story collections
Short story collections by M. R. James
Ghosts in written fiction
Ghost stories
Horror short story collections